Walter Pontel (born 4 October 1937 in Milan; died 6 January 2003 in Salerno in a traffic accident) was an Italian professional football player and coach.

Honours
 Coppa Italia winner: 1961/62.

1937 births
2003 deaths
Road incident deaths in Italy
Italian footballers
Serie A players
Serie B players
Inter Milan players
Calcio Lecco 1912 players
Palermo F.C. players
Catania S.S.D. players
Novara F.C. players
S.S.C. Napoli players
Calcio Padova players
Udinese Calcio players
Italian football managers
Association football goalkeepers